Yurutí, or Wajiara, is a Tucanoan language of Colombia, with around 1,200 speakers in Colombia and Brazil.

Phonology

References

Languages of Colombia
Tucanoan languages